The Shewhart Medal, named in honour of Walter A. Shewhart, is awarded annually by the American Society for Quality for ...outstanding technical leadership in the field of modern quality control, especially through the development to its theory, principles, and techniques. The first medal was awarded in 1948.

See also

 List of mathematics awards
 Wilks Memorial Award

References

External links
Official website

Awards established in 1948
Statistical awards